Waitara is the name of a number of localities:

 Waitara, New South Wales
 Waitara, New Zealand
 Waitara, Queensland
 Waitara River in Taranaki, New Zealand